Oru Sundariyude Katha is a 1972 Indian Malayalam-language film, directed by Thoppil Bhasi and produced by M. Kunchacko. The film stars Prem Nazir, Jayabharathi, KPAC Lalitha and Adoor Bhasi. The film had musical score by G. Devarajan. This was the debut film of actor Nedumudi Venu.

Cast

Prem Nazir as Maadan/Kuttappan
Jayabharathi as Sundari/Lathika
KPAC Lalitha as Pankajakshi
Adoor Bhasi as Unthuvandi Krishnankutty
Manavalan Joseph as Divakaran
Jesey as Georgekutty
Adoor Pankajam as Pachiyakka
Alummoodan as Naanukuttan
K. P. Ummer as Engineer
O. Madhavan
S. P. Pillai as Pappu Shipayi
Beatrice as Kunjamma
Vijayakumari as Kunjiyamma
Mavelikkara Ponnamma as Thankachi
Cherthala Lalika as Contractor's wife
 S. Aroor
 Kottayam Narayanan
 Johnson
 Jisha Mol
 Mahila Mani
 Aaradan
 Thoppil Krishnapilla
 Nedumudi Venu
 Faazil

Soundtrack
The music was composed by G. Devarajan with lyrics by Vayalar Ramavarma.

References

External links
 

1972 films
1970s Malayalam-language films
Films directed by Thoppil Bhasi